The Murder of Caesar is a 1865 painting by Karl von Piloty which depicts the assassination of Julius Caesar.

Description
The painting positions Caesar seated, crowned, and robed in a scarlet toga, as the centre and focus of composition. Tillius Cimber is depicted pulling on Caesar's toga to both distract and pin him, as Servilius Casca sneaks behind Caesar and attempts to stab Caesar with a dagger.

Reception
The Contemporary Review described the paintings as "a highly realistic, dramatic, not to say sporadic, composition". "Pitloy paints for effect, his art indeed would be artificial were it not empathetically real. The perfecting of a sensational style has been with him for a life study." The Art Journal stated that it was "truly a great work".

References

External links

Paintings of the death of Julius Caesar
1865 paintings